Marco Niemerski, known professionally as Tensnake (born 1975), is a German DJ and producer from Hamburg best known for his 2010 track "Coma Cat", which appeared on at least 15 compilations that year.

"Coma Cat" reached number 85 on the UK Singles Chart, number 11 on the UK Indie Chart and number 17 on the UK Dance Chart.

Musical career 

Tensnake emerged in the mid-2000s with a disco-influenced style and rose to critical acclaim by the end of the decade. He is most widely known for his popular 2010 song "Coma Cat".

Born in Hamburg in 1975, Marco grew up listening to disco, soul, boogie, funk and 80s pop. As he grew older he went through a brief Mod phase before finding and embracing more dancefloor-inspired influences from Larry Levan to Junior Boys Own, Romanthony to Masters of Work. After starting the Mirau label with friends in 2005, Marco's first record was "Around The House". He made his commercial recording debut on the Mirau label with his Restless EP in 2006, which he followed up with I Say Mista in 2007. In addition, he released EPs on the labels Players Paradise (Dust, 2007), Radius Records (Fried Egg, 2007), and Endless Flight (Keep Believin’, 2008).

Tensnake's first taste of critical acclaim came with the release of "In the End (I Want You to Cry)" EP on the label Running Back in 2009. The EP was voted number one on djhistory.com's end-of-the-year list, and was the main driver behind Tensnake's breakthrough success. The release of "Coma Cat" in 2010 was the defining moment of his career to date. The track entered four charts published by the Official Charts Company, including number 85 on the UK Singles Chart. His debut album, Glow, was released in 2014. Talking about the album's lead single "58BPM" featuring Fiora, Tensnake commented “I wanted to make a statement with the first single and surprise people.” Glow features collaborations with Fiora, Stuart Price, Jamie Liddell, MNEK, Jeremy Glenn, Gabriel Stebbing (Nightworks) as well as Nile Rodgers.

In 2013 Tensnake launched his own label called True Romance. The label has put out releases from artists such as Alan Dixon, T.U.R.F, Sunrise Highway, Dagfest, Phil Gerus, Tiger & Woods, Gerd Janson, Tuff City Kids, ILO and MAXI MERAKI. Tensnake has put out several of his own releases on the label as well, including "Hello?", "Machines," "Freundchen," and "Desire."

In recent years, Tensnake has made notable festival performances at Coachella (2016), Glastonbury (2016), Panorama Festival (2016), CRSSD Festival (2017), Splash House (2017), EDC Japan (2018), and Tomorrowland (2019).

After a two-year hiatus, Tensnake returned in November 2019 with "Rules" featuring Chenai, the first release from True Romance and its new partnership with Armada's Electronic Elements imprint. In January 2020, he followed with the release of  "Automatic" featuring Fiora, which was announced as the first official single from his sophomore album L.A. On March 27th 2020, Tensnake released the "Automatic" remixes EP, featuring mixes from Gerd Janson, Kraak & Smaak, and a club mix of his own. On May 8th 2020, he released the second single from L.A., "Somebody Else" featuring Boy Matthews. On July 10th 2020, he released a new single, "Strange Without You", featuring Sony/ATV vocalist and songwriter Daramola. On August 14th 2020, he released another single, "Make You Mine". 

Tensnake's second studio album, L.A., was released on October 16th 2020. The album "tells the story of Niemerski's time spent living in the city of angels, ranging from euphoric days enjoying the city's party scene to bittersweet emotions from ending a six-year relationship." Tensnake eventually left Los Angeles and returned to Hamburg, Germany.

Discography

Albums 
 Glow (2014)
 L.A. (2020)

Compilations 

 Tensnake - In the House (2010)

EPs and singles 

 "Toshi's Battle" 2006
 "Around The House" 2006
 "Look To The Sky" 2007
 "I Say Mista" 2007
 "Dust" 2007
 "White Dog" 2007
 "Show Me" 2007
 "Seconds of Gwernd" 2007
 "Hanselstadt" 2007
 "Can You Feel It" 2009
 "The Then Unknown" 2009
 "Holding Back (My Love)" 2009
 "In The End (I Want to Cry)" 2009
 "Get It Right" 2010
 "Need Your Lovin" 2010
 "Coma Cat" 2010 (UK #85)
 "You Know I Know It" 2011
 "Something About You" 2011
 "Congolal" 2011
 "Around The House" 2012
 "Mainline" 2013
 "58 BPM / See Right Through" 2013
 "Bliss" 2013
 "Keep On Talking" 2015
 "Desire" 2016
 "Freundchen" 2016
 "Cielo" 2017
 "Machines" 2017
 "Hello?" 2017
 "Rules" featuring Chenai 2019
 "Automatic" featuring Fiora 2020
 "Somebody Else" featuring Boy Matthews 2020
 "Strange Without You" featuring Daramola 2020
 "Make You Mine" 2020
"Antibodies" featuring Cara Melin 2020

Remixes 

Junior Boys – ‘FM’ (Tensnake Remix) (Domino) 2007
 Camaro's Gang – ‘Fuerza Major’ (Tensnake Remix) (Radius Records) 2007
 Paulo Olarte – ‘Oscuro Claro’ (Tensnake Remix) (Fresh Fish) 2007
The Embassy – ‘Lurking’ (Lurking With A Tensnake Remix) (Permanent Vacation) (2008)
Sally Shapiro – ‘I'll Be By Your Side’ (Tensnake Remix) (Permanent Vacation) 2008
Alexander Robotnick - ’Disco Sick’ (Tensnake Remix) (Endless Flight) 2008
 Ajello – ‘Moody Bang’ (Tensnake Remix) (Rebirth) 2009
 Toby Tobias – ‘In Your Eyes’ (Tensnake Remix) (Rekids) 2009
The Faint - Battle Hymn For Children (Tensnake Remix) (Boys Noize Records) 2009
 The Swiss – ‘Manthem’ (Tensnake Remix) (Modular Recordings) 2009
 Polargeist – ‘Home From The Can’ (Tensnake Remix) (Bang Gang) 2009
 Mano Le Tough – ‘Eurodancer’ (Dances For Euros) (Tensnake Remix) (Mirau) 2010
Aloe Blacc – ‘I Need A Dollar’ (Tensnake Remix) (Vertigo, Universal Music Group, Stones Throw Records) 2010
 Azari & III - ’Reckless With Your Love’ (Tensnake Remix) (Permanent Vacation) 2010
 Scissor Sisters – ‘Any Which Way’ (Tensnake Remix) (Polydor) 2010
Goldfrapp – ‘Alive’ (Tensnake Remix) (Mute) 2010
Little Dragon - Ritual Union (Tensnake Remix) 2011
Friendly Fires - Hurting (Tensnake Remix) 2011
 Lana Del Rey - 'National Anthem' (Tensnake Remix) 2012
 Lauer - Trainmann (Tensnake Remixes) 2012
 Little Boots - Every Night I Say A Prayer (Tensnake Remix) 2012
 Mark Knight - Nothing Matters (Tensnake Remix) 2012
 Pet Shop Boys - Thursday (Tensnake Remix) (X2) 2013
 London Grammar - Hey Now (Tensnake Remix) 2014
 Duke Dumont - I Got U (Tensnake Remix) 2014
 Psychemagik - Black Noir Schwarz (Tensnake Remix) 2014
 JR JR - Gone (Tensnake Remix) 2015
 Boys Noize - Starchild ft. POLICA (Tensnake Remix) 2017
 Tuff City Kids - Tell Me (Tensnake Remix) 2017
 Falco - Hoch wie nie (Tensnake's Sutje Remix) 2017
 Xinobi - Far Away Place (Tensnake Remix) 2018
Charlotte Gainsbourg - Sylvia Says (Tensnake Remix and Tensnake Extended Remix) 2018
 Cut Copy - Standing In The Middle Of The Field (Tensnake Remix) 2018
 Claptone - Stronger ft. Ben Duffy (Tensnake Remix) 2018
 Monkey Safari - Odyssey (Tensnake Remix) 2018
 Milo Greene - Move (Tensnake Remix) 2018
 Rhye - Count To Five (Tensnake Remix) 2018
 Lorenz Rhode - And I Said (Tensnake Remix) 2018
 Mousse T. - Melodie (Tensnake Remix) 2018
John Roberts - Looking (Tensnake Remix) - 2019
Budakid - No Strings Attached (Tensnake Remix) - 2019
Running Touch - Make Your Move (Tensnake Remix) - 2019
Foals - Sunday (Tensnake Remix) - 2019
Kasper Bjorke - Seabird (Tensnake Remix) - 2020
Boston Bun & Dombresky - Stronger (Tensnake Remix) - 2020
Duke Dumont - Nightcrawler (Tensnake Remix) - 2020
Oliver Heldens ft. Boy Matthews - Details (Tensnake Remix) - 2020
Dua Lipa - Hallucinate (Tensnake Remix) - 2020
Kraak & Smaak ft. The Palms - Same Blood (Tensnake Remix) - 2020
Dermot Kennedy - Giants (Tensnake Remix) - 2020
In Deep We Trust - Ba:sen (Tensnake Remix) - 2021
R Plus - Love Will Tear Us Apart (Tensnake Remix) - 2021
Mila Smith - Liars & Fakes (Tensnake Remix) - 2021
DRAMA - Don't Hold Back (Tensnake Remix) - 2021
Anti Up - Sensational (Tensnake Remix) - 2021
Taylor Swift – "Lavender Haze" (Tensnake Remix) - 2023

Appearances 
 Radio 1 Essential Mix (16/02/2013)

References

External links
 

Living people
Club DJs
House musicians
German house musicians
German techno musicians
German DJs
German dance musicians
DJs from Hamburg
1975 births
Electronic dance music DJs